Kowsar Lorestan Football Club (Persian:کوثر لرستان) is an Iranian club based in Khoramabad, Lorestan Province. They play their home matches in the 20,000 seater stadium Takhti Kohramabad.

Season-by-season
The table below chronicles the achievements of Kowsar in various competitions since 2006.

Players
As of February 12, 2010

First-team squad

For recent transfers, see List of Iranian football transfers, summer 2010''.

Club managers
  Mostafa Ghanbarpour  (June 2008 – Nov 08)
  Majid Bagheriniya (Nov 2008 – June 9)
  Reza Ahadi (June 2009 – Oct 09)
  Mostafa Ghanbarpour  (Oct 2009–)

References

External links
  Players and Results
  official web blog

See also
 Hazfi Cup

Football clubs in Iran
Lorestan Province
2008 establishments in Iran
Association football clubs established in 2008